Michael Fennelly may refer to:

 Michael Fennelly (musician) (born 1949), American singer and songwriter in the 1960s and 1970s
 Michael Fennelly (hurler) (born 1985), Irish hurler